The Very Best of the Imperials is a compilation album by Christian music group the Imperials, released in late 1981 on DaySpring Records. It is a collection of the Imperials' best songs from the Russ Taff years 1976–1980, covering their four albums Sail On, Heed the Call, One More Song for You and Priority. The album also contains a never-before-released track "Same Old Fashioned Way" written and performed by baritone singer David Will recorded in 1976. It would later be featured on The Lost Album in 2006. The track is produced by recording artist-producer Gary S. Paxton. The album peaked at number two on the Billboard Top Inspirational Albums chart.

Track listing

Note: (*) – tracks produced by Michael Omartian; (**) – tracks produced by Chris Christian; (***) – produced by Gary S. Paxton

Personnel

The Imperials
 Russ Taff – lead vocals
 Jim Murray – tenor, vocals
 David Will – baritone, vocals
 Armond Morales – bass, vocals

Charts

References

1981 compilation albums
The Imperials albums
Word Records albums